The A18 Snaefell Mountain Road or Mountain Road is a primary main A-road of  in length  which connects the towns of Douglas and Ramsey in the Isle of Man.

Description
The Mountain Road is part of Isle of Man TT Mountain Course or TT Course, a road-racing circuit used for the Isle of Man TT and Manx Grand Prix races, which have been held in the Isle of Man from 1911 and 1923 respectively. In the races, it is one-way from Ramsey towards Douglas. The racing is held on public roads closed for racing by an Act of Tynwald (the parliament of the Isle of Man). It is the oldest motor-cycle racing circuit still in use.

The A18 Snaefell Mountain Road was described in the publication Classic Motor-Sport Routes as:

Route

The A18 Snaefell Mountain Road runs from the A2 Governor's Road at Governor's Bridge in Douglas north to Ramsey, and includes the A18 Bemahague Road from Governor's Bridge to Signpost Corner with the A39 Hillbery Road junction. As part of the Isle of Man TT Mountain Course, in reverse direction it passes through Cronk-ny-Mona and the road junction with the A6 Johnny Watterson's Lane and the C10 Scollag Road.  The A18 Road then passes Hillberry Corner and the junction with the C22 Little Mill Road, Brandish Corner, Creg-ny-Baa, Kate's Cottage, Keppel Gate, the Windy Corner and the B10 Beinn-y-Phott Road road junction with Brandywell.

Continuing north, the A18 Mountain Road passes over the Snaefell Mountain Railway tramway crossing at the Bungalow and the A14 Sulby Glen Road, Bungalow Bridge, Verandah, Stonebreakers Hut, East Snaefell Mountain Gate, Mountain Box, the Mountain Mile including Guthrie's Memorial, 26th Milestone, the D28 Hibernia Road junction at the Gooseneck, Water Works Corner, Ramsey Hairpin and Whitegates. The A18 Snaefell Mountain Road at its northern end includes two small sections of road previously held in private ownership between Cruickshank's Corner and the road junctions with the A9 Ramsey to Andreas Road and the A2 Douglas to Ramsey Road situated in the town of Ramsey.

Origins and History

The A18 Snaefell Mountain Road was developed in the mid-19th century from a number of pre-existing roads, cart-tracks and bridle paths. This included installation of a number of sheep-gates including the East Mountain Gate, the Beinn-y-Phott sheep-gate at Brandywell and Keppel Gate. The section of the A18 Snaefell Mountain Road  from Keppel Gate northwards to the Gooseneck corner near Ramsey was built on common grazing land that was transferred to the Crown following the sale of the Island's feudal rights by the Duke of Atholl after the Disafforesting Commission of 1860.

As the A18 Snaefell Mountain Road is purpose-built, it reflects typical 19th century highway and railway construction practices, with many small-scale cuttings, embankments and revetments, and follows land contours with purpose-built graded sections intersected by right-angle bends, road junctions and sheep-gates.

Milestones
The A18 Snaefell Mountain Road has small metal milestones from the period of James Garrow as Isle of Man Surveyor-General; they are numbered numerically from Douglas to Ramsey.

National Geographic Top 10 Drives
In 2014, the National Geographic magazine nominated the A18 Snaefell Mountain Road as No 8 in the Top 10 Driver's Drives.

Sources

External links

 Isle of Man Government Webcam Station
 Bungalow Bridge to Thirty Third Milestone with Steve Hislop, 11 times TT winner
 TT Spectator Guide Section The Bungalow to Kate's Cottage
 Map of course

Roads in the Isle of Man